Georgios Melabianakis (born 26 January 1981) is a Greek footballer. He currently plays for Aias Salamina F.C.

Career
Born in Athens, Melabianakis began playing football in Olympiacos' youth teams. He was loaned to lower-division clubs, Egaleo, Chania and Fostiras, before joining Olympiacos' first team for the 2002–03 season. He did not play for the first team and joined Ionikos the following season. He played 4.5 seasons with Ionikos, and also joined Veria in the Greek Super League for one season on loan.

References

External links
 
Myplayer Profile
Profile at Insports.gr
Profile at Onsports.gr

1981 births
Living people
Egaleo F.C. players
Ionikos F.C. players
Veria F.C. players
Anagennisi Karditsa F.C. players
Olympiacos F.C. players
Association football defenders
Footballers from Athens
Greek footballers